Eisingen is a municipality in the district of Enz in Baden-Württemberg in Germany. It is situated on the Bertha Benz Memorial Route and contains no other villages.

History
Eisingen became a possession of the Margraviate of Baden in late 1495. It was governed by the district of Pforzheim until 1803, when it was reassigned to the district of Stein. Stein's district was dissolved on 25 May 1821 and Eisingen returned to Pforzheim's jurisdiction.

On 1 March 1985, the  Federally-protected nature preserve was created and is mostly located inside Eisingen.

Geography
The primary watercourse in Eisingen is the Gennenbach, a tributary of the Kämpfelbach. The lowest elevation above sea level in the municipal area is  Normalnull (NN) at the Untere Herrschaftswiesen. The highest elevation is the top of the Heidenkeller, at  NN.

Politics
The mayor, Roland Bauer since December 2013, is entitled to a vote on the municipal council.

Coat of arms
Eisingen's municipal coat of arms depicts a plowshare in gold above a silver-bladed billhook on a field of red. The plowshare and the billhook reference town's history of viticulture, and were used on local boundary stones. The first municipal coat of arms was granted by the Margraves of Baden in 1497 and featured a plowshare and a billhook.

References

External links
 Official Webpage
 Bertha Benz Memorial Route 

Enzkreis
Baden